The loquat (Eriobotrya japonica) is a large evergreen shrub or tree, grown commercially for its orange fruit and for its leaves, which are used to make herbal tea. It is also cultivated as an ornamental plant.

The loquat is in the family Rosaceae, and is native to the cooler hill regions of south-central China. In Japan the loquat is known as biwa (枇杷, びわ) and has been grown for over 1,000 years. The loquat has been introduced to regions with subtropical to mild temperate climates throughout the world.

Eriobotrya japonica was formerly thought to be closely related to the genus Mespilus, and is still sometimes mistakenly known as the Japanese medlar. It is also known as Japanese plum and Chinese plum, as well as pipa in China, naspli in Malta, Lukaat in India, Lucat / Loket in Sri Lanka, níspero in Spain, nêspera in Portugal, shések in Israel, akidéné in Lebanon, Ebirangweti  in Kisii, nespolo in Italy (where the name is shared with Mespilus germanica), and golabi jangali (jungle pear) in Iran.

Description
Eriobotrya japonica is a large evergreen shrub or small tree, with a rounded crown, short trunk and woolly new twigs. The fruit begins to ripen during spring to summer depending on the temperature in the area.

Fruit
Loquats are unusual among fruit trees in that the flowers appear in the autumn or early winter, and the fruits are ripe at any time from early spring to early summer. The flowers have a sweet, heady aroma that can be smelled from a distance.

The succulent, tangy flesh is white, yellow or orange and sweet to subacid or acid, depending on the cultivar.

Each fruit contains from one to ten ovules, with three to five being most common.  A variable number of the ovules mature into large brown seeds (with different numbers of seeds appearing in each fruit on the same tree, usually between one and four).

History and taxonomy 

The plant is originally from China, where related species can be found growing in the wild. It has been cultivated there for over a thousand years. It has also become naturalised in Georgia,  Armenia, Afghanistan, Australia, Azerbaijan, Bermuda, Chile, Kenya, Lebanon, India, Iran, Iraq, Israel, South Africa, the whole Mediterranean Basin, Pakistan, New Zealand, Réunion, Tonga, Central America, Mexico, South America and in warmer parts of the United States (Hawaii, California, Texas, Louisiana, Mississippi, Alabama, Florida, Georgia, and South Carolina).  In Louisiana, many refer to loquats as "misbeliefs" and they grow in yards of homes. Chinese immigrants are presumed to have carried the loquat to Hawaii and California. It has been cultivated in Japan for about 1,000 years and presumably the fruits and seeds were brought back from China to Japan by the many Japanese scholars visiting and studying in China during the Tang Dynasty.

The loquat was often mentioned in medieval Chinese literature, such as the poems of Li Bai. Its original name is no longer used in most Chinese dialects, and has been replaced by pipa, which is a reference to the fruit's visual resemblance to a miniature pipa lute.

The first European record of the species might have been in the 16th century by Michał Boym, a Polish jesuit, orientalist, politician and missionary to China. He described loquat in his Flora sinensis, the first European natural history book about China. The common name for the fruit is from Portuguese nêspera (from the modified nespilus, originally mespilus, which referred to the medlar), (José Pedro Machado, Dicionário Etimológico da Língua Portuguesa, 1967). Since the first contact of the Portuguese with the Japanese and Chinese dates also from the sixteenth century, it is possible that some were brought back to Europe, as was probably the case with other species like the hachiya persimmon variety.

Eriobotrya japonica was again described in Europe by Carl Peter Thunberg, as Mespilus japonica in 1780, and was relocated to the genus Eriobotrya (from Greek εριο "wool" and βοτρυών "cluster") by John Lindley, who published these changes in 1821.

The most common variety in Portugal is the late ripening Tanaka, where it is popular in gardens and backyards, but not commercially produced. In northern Portugal it is also popularly called magnório/magnólio, probably something to do with the French botanist Pierre Magnol. In Spain, the fruits are similarly called "nísperos" and are commercially exploited, Spain being the largest producer worldwide, after China, with  41,487t annually, half of which is destined to export markets.

Cultivation
Over 800 loquat cultivars exist in Asia. Self-fertile variants include the 'Gold Nugget' and 'Mogi' cultivars. The loquat is easy to grow in subtropical to mild temperate climates where it is often primarily grown as an ornamental plant, especially for its sweet-scented flowers, and secondarily for its delicious fruit. The boldly textured foliage adds a tropical look to gardens, contrasting well with many other plants.

There are many named cultivars, with orange or white flesh.  Some cultivars are intended for home-growing, where the flowers open gradually, and thus the fruit also ripens gradually, compared to the commercially grown species where the flowers open almost simultaneously, and the whole tree's fruit also ripens together.

China is the biggest producer of loquat in the world, more than 5 times the production of the 2nd biggest producer Spain, followed by Pakistan and Turkey.  In Europe, Spain is the main producer of loquat.

In temperate climates it is grown as an ornamental with winter protection, as the fruits seldom ripen to an edible state.  In the United Kingdom, it has gained the Royal Horticultural Society's Award of Garden Merit.

In the US, the loquat tree is hardy only in USDA zones 8 and above, and will flower only where winter temperatures do not fall below . In such areas, the tree flowers in autumn and the fruit ripens in late winter. It is popular in the East, as well as the South.

The loquat grows poorly if the temperature is "too tropical", but it is unclear at what maximum temperature it can be cultivated.

Altitude is an important factor to consider as well. However the right altitudes will vary depending on the temperature or how close it is to the equator. This contributes to why higher altitudes in China or the Andes mountains make excellent cultivating spots.

China is a major country where loquats grow natively and they grow wild in forests around the mountains.

In the United States cultivation is not country-wide, typically with the southern and western states taking most of the responsibility. Cultivating in the United States has not been very popular due to its lack of interest in markets. However, the one advantage the loquat has among others is its fruit becomes available in late April – early May around a time many other fruits are not ready yet.

In Russia, loquat produces fruits in subtropical and near-subtropical areas (Gelendzhik, Sochi). Loquat also produces fruits in subtropical areas of Georgia. 

In Canada, it can be found growing in Vancouver, though it does not produce fruits. More frost-resistant varieties grow and produce fruits in Sidney, British Columbia, though not every year.

Loquat grows differently in tropical climates, typically blooming 2 to 3 times a year. Loquats usually mature 90 days after the bloom.

Culinary and other uses
The loquat has a high sugar, acid and pectin content.  It is eaten as a fresh fruit and mixes well with other fruits in fresh fruit salads or fruit cups. The fruit is also commonly used to make jam, jelly and chutney, and is often served poached in light syrup. Firm, slightly immature fruits are best for making pies or tarts, while the fruits are the sweetest when soft and orange.

The fruit is sometimes canned or processed into confections. The waste ratio is 30 percent or more, due to the seed size.

The loquat can also be used in juices or smoothies. In South American countries such as Ecuador, the loquat can be used for batidos, where they are mixed with milk, ice, or other fruits.

An American writer calls the loquat's flavor "floral" with hints of apricot and a peach, with the fruit's natural sweetness contributing to its popularity.

Loquats are used commonly as a natural sweetener for many different types of food, and are used to make marmalade and jelly in various locales. Many people use loquats to create sauces and other juices since the acidity goes well with the sweetness, another reason why they are popular for making pies and other pastries.

Loquats are often eaten as a fresh fruit, but need to have the seeds removed in order to be ready to eat.  The seeds not only takes up a great deal of space relative to the size of the fruit (cf. avocado) but also are slightly poisonous in large quantities.  The fruit is often peeled, but the peel is edible and not overly thick.  

Some other uses for loquat include making alcohol, animal feed, and medicine to counter vomiting and thirst. The loquat's trees and flowers also are used in different forms. The loquat's wood is used as an alternative to pear wood and works well to make rulers/other writing instruments. The loquat's flowers are used to make perfume in places like Europe, although its yield is considered low. Powdered loquat leaves are also used to treat diarrhea, depression, and even help to counteract alcoholic intoxication.

Alcoholic beverages
Loquats can also be used to make light wine. They are fermented into a fruit wine, sometimes using just crystal sugar and white liquor.

The liquor nespolino is made from the seeds,  reminiscent of nocino and amaretto, both prepared from nuts and apricot kernels. Both the loquat seeds and the apricot kernels contain cyanogenic glycosides, but the drinks are prepared from varieties that contain only small quantities (such as Mogi and Tanaka), so there is no risk of cyanide poisoning.

Nutrition

The loquat is low in sodium and high in vitamin A, vitamin B6, dietary fiber, potassium, and manganese.

Like most related plants, the seeds (pips) and young leaves of the plant are slightly poisonous, containing small amounts of cyanogenic glycosides (including amygdalin) which release cyanide when digested, though the low concentration and bitter flavour normally prevent enough being eaten to cause harm.

Etymology

The name loquat derives from lou4 gwat1, the Cantonese pronunciation of the classical , literally "black orange". The phrase "black orange" originally actually referred to unripened kumquats, which are dark green in color. But the name was mistakenly applied to the loquat we know today by the ancient Chinese poet Su Shi when he was residing in southern China, and the mistake was widely taken up by the Cantonese region thereafter.

Symbolism
In China, the loquat is known as the 'pipa' (枇杷) and because of its golden colour, represents gold and wealth. It is often one in a bowl or composite of fruits and vegetables (such as spring onions, artemisia leaves, pomegranates, kumquats, etc.) to represent auspicious wishes or the 'Five Prosperities' or wurui (五瑞).

See also
Kumquat – although kumquats are not related botanically to loquats, the two names share an origin in their old Chinese names
 Coppertone loquat, a hybrid of Eriobotrya deflexa (synonym: Photinia deflexa) and Rhaphiolepis indica

References

External links

 Botanical and Horticultural Information on the Loquat (Traditional Chinese).

Eriobotrya
Fruits originating in East Asia
Flora of China
Flora of Japan
Tropical fruit
Plants used in traditional Chinese medicine
Garden plants of Asia
Ornamental trees
Fruit trees
Edible fruits